Aglaia Konrad (born 1960) is an Austrian photographer and educator living in Brussels.

Life
Konrad was born in 1960 Salzbourg, Austria. From 1990 to 1992 she studied at the Jan Van Eyck Academie, where she is also a research assistant. Konrad also teaches at the LUCA School of Arts campus that was formerly known as the Hogeschool Sint-Lukas Brussel.

Work
Konrad's photographs explore urban space in large cities. Konrad's work has been to known to be distinctly international in that it highlights urban elements independent of cultural markers. Her work highlights the ubiquitous elements of urban life through methods like filming a city from the perspective of a moving car or compiling a series of aerial views of skyscrapers.

In 2020 Konrad's work was featured in a group exhibition entitled ‘The Unruly Apparatus’ at the Royal Academy of Fine Arts Antwerp. The photographic research project combined the work of eleven photographers to map out the intersection points between sculpture and photography and create visual responses. Her work highlighted where photography and sculpture meet, conflict, and how new visual work can come out of that friction.

She has had solo shows in Siegen, Antwerp, Geneva, Graz, Cologne and New York City. Her work has also been included in group exhibitions such as documenta X in 1997, Cities on the Move in 1998 and 1999, Talking Cities in 2006 and Vienna International Apartment in 2008.

Awards
Her 2011 book Carrara received a Fernand Baudin Prize. In 2004, she received the  4th Vevey International Photography Award from the Festival des Arts Visuels de Vevey.

In 2007 she was awarded the Albert-Renger-Patzsch-Prize by the Dietrich Oppenberg Foundation.

References 

1960 births
Living people
Photographers from Brussels
People from Salzburg
20th-century Belgian women artists
21st-century Belgian women artists
20th-century women photographers
21st-century women photographers
Belgian women photographers